Wilde is an unincorporated place in northern Manitoba, Canada. It is serviced by the Wilde railway station of the Winnipeg - Churchill train.

References 

Unincorporated communities in Manitoba